Events from the year 1785 in Scotland.

Incumbents

Law officers 
 Lord Advocate – Ilay Campbell
 Solicitor General for Scotland – Robert Dundas of Arniston

Judiciary 
 Lord President of the Court of Session – Lord Arniston, the younger
 Lord Justice General – The Viscount Stormont
 Lord Justice Clerk – Lord Barskimming

Events 
 7 March – geologist James Hutton proposes the theory of uniformitarianism to the Royal Society of Edinburgh.
 Late September – James Boswell’s The Journal of a Tour to the Hebrides is published.
 5 October – flight by Florentine aeronaut Vincenzo Lunardi in a gas balloon from George Heriot's School, Edinburgh, across the Firth of Forth to Ceres, Fife (32 mi (51.5 km) in 1.5 hrs).
 23 November – Lunardi flies from St Andrew's Square, Glasgow, to Hawick.

Births 
 18 May – John Wilson, writer (died 1854)
 18 November – David Wilkie, painter (died at sea 1841)

Deaths 
 23 January – Matthew Stewart, mathematician (born 1717)
 4 October – Alexander Runciman, painter (born 1736)
 23 October – William Cochran, painter (born 1738)

The arts
 22 May – Robert Burns' first child, Elizabeth ("Dear-bought Bess"), is born to his mother's servant, Elizabeth Paton and his poems "To a Mouse" and "Halloween" are written.

References 

 
Years of the 18th century in Scotland
Scotland
1780s in Scotland